Children on the Edge is a non-profit charitable organisation dedicated to working on behalf of some of the most marginalised children around the world. The organisation is based in Chichester and was founded by the owner of The Body Shop, Dame Anita Roddick, (DBE) in 1990 following her visit to several Romanian orphanages. It was co-founded by Rachel Bentley, who has led the organisation to this day.

Prior to joining the E.U, the closing of Romania's state institutions forced many abandoned children to return to violent family homes or to live on the streets. Roddick's organisation helped to shelter them by setting up three orphanages. Once children were released from the orphanage, the organisation helped to shelter and reintegrate them into society.

Children on the Edge started off in Romanian orphanages, but has since expanded to cover many other countries throughout Eastern Europe and Asia, including Bangladesh, Burma, India, Thailand, and Uganda. The charity exists to help children who are living on the edge of their societies around the world. They focus on some of the most marginalised children, who are overlooked by governments, larger organisations, the media and the international community.

History

1990 - 1999 

After Anita Roddick visited Romania for the first time in 1990, The Body Shop  until 1996 undertook refurbishment of three orphanages, provided medical help, and organised annual play schemes. At this time the organisation were entitled "The Body Shop Romania Relief Appeal".

By 1999, the organisation had established the "Big Brothers Big Sisters" programme in Romania for children without parental care. They also provided mobile sanitation units in Albania for refugees from the Kosovan crisis.

2000 - 2009 

The following year, they worked on rebuilding a school in Kosovo, which was destroyed during Kosovan crisis. Much of the experience in Europe contributed to the organisation being invited by UNICEF to implement a Child Friendly Space in a post conflict environment in Viqueque, East Timor.

From 2002 to 2005 they continued to refurbish schools in Kosovo, established semi-independent living apartments for orphaned children in Romania and also opened two Special Needs Day care centres in Romania to help prevent these children being forced into state institutions.

In 2004, Children on the Edge registered as an independent charity and, using the model they had developed in East Timor, established a Child and Community Centre in Aceh, Indonesia helping children and their community rebuild their lives after the traumas of the Asian Tsunami.

Throughout 2006 and 2007 they began work on the Thailand/Burma border, helping Burmese refugees and migrants fleeing persecution from a brutal military regime within their homeland. This started out with the provision of nurseries, which were set up in Ei Htu Hta Refugee camp on the banks of the Salween river.

In 2008, they began the following projects: Apartment Schools in Malaysia for Chin refugees from Myanmar; created a scholarships programme in India for Chin refugee children from Myanmar; and developed standards of care in Thai Boarding Houses for Karen refugees from Myanmar.

Their first trip to Bangladesh was undertaken in 2009, which marked the beginning of their work with the unregistered Rohingya community in the makeshift Kutupalong camp, providing low profile education for their children. Concurrently they began supporting nine Learning Centres for slum dwelling children in neighbouring Cox's Bazar.

2010 - 2019 

After the 2010 Haitian earthquake, they started supporting a sports and education programme children in the slums of Port au Prince, Haiti.

In 2012, they established a Child Friendly Space, agricultural training programme and a voluntary Child Protection Team in Soweto Slum, Jinja, Uganda.

To continue their work with children displaced by conflict, the following year Children on the Edge started providing Early Childhood Development and support for children displaced by war and living in the remote IDP camps of Kachin State, Myanmar.

In 2014, they began supporting an education programme for ‘untouchable’ Dalit children in Bihar State, India. At this time they also began to provide support for children in brothel communities on the India/Nepal border. Again working with refugee children, 2014 was also the year they started investing in tent schools for Syrian children living in the informal settlements of Bekaa Valley, Lebanon.

Work in Uganda had been progressing over the last two years and in 2015 "Children on the Edge Africa" was registered in Uganda. The new Ugandan team was expanding the work of Child Protection Team in Soweto to further slum areas surrounding Jinja

In 2017, the Rohingya genocide triggered over 700,000 more Rohingya refugees to flee to Bangladesh, into the areas on the border where the charity was providing education. They responded with a brief humanitarian relief programme and expanded education work in the camps for 7,500 children.

The following year, they also established ten Learning Centres for Rohingya refugee children in the Doharazi Enclaves, Bangladesh.

Using a model built up in the Jinja slum areas, and experience developed in Kachin State, Myanmar, in 2019 they began to replicate their Early Childhood Development work by supporting Congolese refugee communities in Kyaka II, Uganda to provide high quality early years education for their children.

References

External links 
 

Children's charities based in the United Kingdom
Chichester
Children's charities